Khadga is a Nepalese given name. Notable people with the name include:

Khadga Prasad Sharma Oli, former Prime Minister of Nepal
Khadga Bahadur Bishwakarma, Nepali politician
Khadga Jeet Baral Magar, Nepali singer
Khadgajeet Baral, Nepalese police officer

Nepalese given names